Marco da Fundação da Cidade do Salvador is a monument in Salvador, Bahia, Brazil. It is located at the north of the Porto da Barra Beach and directly below the São Diogo Fort. It commemorates the 400th century of the founding of Salvador, and was inaugurated on March 29, 1952. The monument consists of two parts: a limestone pillar, and a mural of azulejos.

The panel of azulejos, or blue and white tiles, depicts the arrival of Tomé de Sousa (1503–1579), the first governor-general of Bahia. The stone pillar was carved by João Fragoso, a Portuguese artistan. It was installed on March 29, 1952. Eduardo Gomes, a Portuguese artist, designed the azulejos in 2003 using a scene by Joaquim Rebocho (1912-2003). The monument is the property of the City of Salvador. It was restored in 2013 and 2017.

Antônio Carlos Magalhães Neto, mayor of Salvador, designated the monument a landmark of the City of Salvador on January 27, 2019. Landmark status was requested by the Associação de Moradores e Amigos da Barra, a residents association, and the Academy of Letters of Bahia.

See also

 Porto da Barra Beach
 João Fragoso
 Joaquim Rebocho

References

1952 sculptures
Azulejos in Brazil
Buildings and structures completed in 1952
Outdoor sculptures in Brazil
Stone sculptures in Brazil